"Quién Sabe" is a song by Dominican singer Natti Natasha for her debut album, Iluminatti, which was released on 15 February, 2019, through Pina Records and Sony Music Latin. According to Billboard, "Quien Sabe" became the first bachata song ever to enter the ¡Viva Latino! list. The song is her first solo single, after having previously released numerous collaborative singles with other artists.

Background and composition 
"Quién Sabe" was written by Natalia Gutiérrez, Wise "The Gold Pen", Lenny Santos, Yoel Damas and Rafael Pina. "Quién Sabe" is a bachata song. The song is written in the key of A Minor and has a moderately fast tempo of 128 beats per minute.

Natti Natasha shared the announcement of this video and single on social networks, and said:

Music video 
The music video for "Quién Sabe" was directed by Daniel Duran.

The music video received over 5 million on YouTube in its first day of release, and has since surpassed over 420 million views on the platform.

Awards and nominations 
At the 31st Premio Lo Nuestro ceremony, "Quién Sabe" garnered two nominations: "Single of the Year" and "Song of the Year – Tropical".

Charts

Weekly charts

Year-end charts

References 

2018 singles
2018 songs
Natti Natasha songs
Songs written by Rafael Pina
Spanish-language songs
Pina Records singles
Sony Music Latin singles
Bachata songs